Kentucky Route 395 (KY 395) is a state highway in the U.S. state of Kentucky.

Route description

The route originates at a junction with KY 44 near Anderson City and travels northward to Birdie where it meets the southern terminus of KY 512 and turns more toward the northwest. At Crooked Creek Road the route turns toward the north and enters Shelby County roughly 1.5 miles further to the north. 1.5 miles into Shelby County, the route meets the southern terminus of KY 1472 and turns toward the west, passing through Harrisonville. Roughly 1.5 miles west of KY 636 the route turns toward the northwest then northeast into Waddy. North of Waddy KY 395 crosses Interstate 64 at Exit 43 and continues north across US 60. It then travels through Bagdad and ends at KY 43 roughly 5.5 miles north of Bagdad in Elmburg. The entire route is located in primarily rural sections of Anderson and Shelby counties.

Major intersections

References

External links
 

0395
0395
0395